Dactyloceras richinii is a moth in the family Brahmaeidae. It was described by Emilio Berio in 1940 and is found in Eritrea.

References

Arctiidae genus list at Butterflies and Moths of the World of the Natural History Museum

Endemic fauna of Eritrea
Brahmaeidae
Moths described in 1940